The 1988–89 Yugoslav First Basketball League season was the 45th season of the Yugoslav First Basketball League, the highest professional basketball league in SFR Yugoslavia.

Regular season

Classification

Playoff

Finals
The Yugoslav First League's 1989 playoffs final series saw the regular season top seed and newly-minted FIBA Korać Cup winner KK Partizan take on the regular season second seed and newly crowned European champions Jugoplastika.

Game 1: Partizan vs. Jugoplastika 73-74
Game one was played on 22 April 1989 in front of 6,500 spectators at Hala sportova, refereed by Zoran Grbac (from Šibenik) and Tomislav Jovančić (from Valjevo).

For most of the second half, the game was a tense seesaw affair with frequent lead changes. With less than two minutes to go and Jugoplastika up by one, Partizan played the ball down in the low post to Vlade Divac who quickly got double-teamed and kicked the ball out to the open teammate, young shooting guard Predrag Danilović, on the three-point line. Nineteen-year-old Danilović air-balled the wide open three and Jugoplastika's Toni Kukoč, who grabbed Danilović's air ball, ran a quick counterattack with Partizan's defence out of position, passing off to wide open  who scored for 71-74. By the end, Partizan only managed to get closer to 73-74 via Divac drawing a foul then hitting two free throws. After successfully defending Jugoplastika's following possession, Partizan then, with 23 seconds left, had the game's last possession that once again went to Divac who drove right from the left side of the half court, getting into traffic of defensive Jugoplastika bodies under the basket and missing his half-hook shot. Jugoplastika won away, 73-74, behind Sobin's game-high 21 points, thus taking the home-court advantage from Partizan.

Game 2: Jugoplastika vs. Partizan 75-70
Played in front packed Gripe Hall with 8,000 spectators, visitors Partizan were up 43-44 at the half.

In the second half, the lead kept changing throughout the period. Entering the last minute of play, with Jugoplastika up by 3, Partizan point guard Saša Đorđević's three-point attempt was blocked by Luka Pavićević who then grabbed the ball and ran it the other way for a layup and 75-70 Jugoplastika lead. In Partizan's following possession, Žarko Paspalj got fouled in the act of shooting with 28 seconds left in the game. During the timeout before Paspalj's free throws, already incensed with some of the prior decisions by the two refs—Zdravko Kurilić (from Tuzla) and Ljupče Ristovski (from Skopje)—Partizan's head coach Duško Vujošević began intensely going at Kurilić verbally and was assessed a technical foul. With Vujošević continually raging at referee Kurilić and Partizan bench pelted with coins and other objects by the Split crowd, Vujošević decided to take his team off the court and not return. The score at the time of Partizan's walk-out, 75-70, was registered as the final score of the game.

Game 3: Jugoplastika vs. Partizan 2-0
The Yugoslav Basketball Federation's (KSJ) competition commission headed by Radomir Šaper looked into the case of Partizan walking off the court in game two and decided to register game three administratively as a 2-0 Jugoplastika home win. Jugoplastika thus won the 1988-89 Yugoslav League title, beating Partizan 3-games-to-0.

The winning roster of Jugoplastika:
  Zoran Sretenović
  Velimir Perasović
  Toni Kukoč
  
  Ivica Burić
  Žan Tabak
  Duško Ivanović
  Dino Rađa
  Petar Vučica
  Paško Tomić
  Teo Čizmić
  Luka Pavićević

Coach:  Božidar Maljković

Scoring leaders
Milan Mlađan (IMT) - __ points (30.8 ppg) or (31.1ppg)

Qualification in 1989-90 season European competitions 

FIBA European Champions Cup
 Jugoplastika (champions)

FIBA Cup Winners' Cup
 Partizan (Cup winners)

FIBA Korać Cup
 Bosna (3rd)
 Crvena Zvezda (4th)
 Zadar (playoffs)
 Smelt Olimpija (playoffs)

References

Yugoslav First Basketball League seasons
Yugo
Yugo